Pelagielloidea is an extinct superfamily of Paleozoic fossil molluscs of uncertain position, either (Gastropoda or Monoplacophora).

Families 
Families in the superfamily Pelagielloidea:
 † Pelagiellidae
 † Aldanellidae

References 

Helcionelloida